Lal Chunariya is a 1983 Indian Hindi-language film directed by Sundershan Lal, starring Parikshit Sahni, Zarina Wahab, Aruna Irani, Pradeep Kumar, Romesh Sharma and  Mithun Chakraborty in a special appearance par excellence.

Cast
Parikshit Sahni as Rajesh
Zarina Wahab as Kamini
Aruna Irani as Gulab Bai
Chand Usmani as Ratna Bai
Romesh Sharma as Kundan
Pradeep Kumar as Shankarlal
Mithun Chakraborty
 [[Ahmad Harhash as Raj

Songs
Lyrics: Kulwant Jani

"Tere Hi Naam Ki Dekh Sanvariya" (Happy) - Lata Mangeshkar
"Aa Ja Ke Teri Raah Men Palke Bicha" - Chandrani Mukherjee
"Tumhen Kisne Kaha Hai Husn Chhupane" - Mahendra Kapoor, Manhar Udhas
"Tere Hi Naam Ki Dekh Sanvariya" (Sad) - Lata Mangeshkar
"Gulabi Chude Wali Yeh Dil Mod De" - Shailendra Singh, Dilraaj Kaur
"Gham Diya Hai Pyar Ne To Meharbani" - Mahendra Kapoor
"Jise Jalvon Ki Hasrat Ho Woh" - Asha Bhosle
"Na Mohabbat Ke Liye Hain Na Ibadat" - Anuradha Paudwal

References

External links
 
http://ibosnetwork.com/asp/filmbodetails.asp?id=Lal+Chunariya

1983 films
1980s Hindi-language films
Films scored by Shyamji–Ghanshyamji